Rolling a contract is an investment concept meaning trading out of a standard contract and then buying the contract with next longest maturity, so as to maintain a position with constant maturity.

Motivation
One may roll a contract because one has a special preference for a specific maturity—for example, the five-year CDS rate of a given name—or because a given on-the-run security is more liquid than off-the-run securities.

Examples
While holding US Treasuries, one may wish to hold only the most recently issued security of a given maturity, the so-called on-the-run security. Thus, if one has purchased the on-the-run 30-year treasury and a new 30-year auction occurs, one may sell the old treasury, which is now off-the-run, and purchase the new on-the-run treasury.

There is generally very high trading activity on these dates, as contracts whose maturity falls on them are rolled.

Index roll congestion
When an index has a published policy for rolling its contracts, such as on a given day or over a given period, a trading strategy is to roll in advance of the index, in anticipation of its trading volume. This is referred to as index roll congestion or, pejoratively, "date rape".

See also
 Jelly roll (options)
 Rollover (foreign exchange)

References 

Investment